Albert Park is a baseball field that is now home to the San Rafael Pacifics. The Pacifics are a member of the Pecos League, an independent professional baseball league not affiliated with Major League Baseball. The park opened March 18,1951, on land donated by businessman and local entrepreneur Jacob Albert, in 1937. In the early 1950s, Yankee infielder and future legendary skipper Billy Martin would bring a bunch of the best semipro players from his side of the bay over the Albert Park for a weekend. The Field measurements are 325' (99 m) on left & right field lines and 370' (113 m) in center field.

References

Baseball venues in California
San Rafael, California